Buford B. Nunley (February 5, 1912 – December 5, 1979) was an American Negro league first baseman in the 1930s.

A native of Des Arc, Arkansas, Nunley played for the Little Rock Grays in 1932. In five recorded games, he posted three hits in 15 plate appearances. Nunley died in South Bend, Indiana in 1979 at age 67.

References

External links
 and Seamheads

1912 births
1979 deaths
Little Rock Grays players
Baseball first basemen
Baseball players from Arkansas
People from Prairie County, Arkansas
20th-century African-American sportspeople